Lisky may refer to:

Líský, a village in the Czech Republic
Lisky, Izmail Raion, Odesa Oblast, a village in Ukraine
Lisky, Kyiv, an area within the Dniprovskyi District, Kyiv, Ukraine